Khan Kluay 2 is a 2009 Thai 3D computer-animated action-adventure film, directed by Taweelap Srivuthivong and released in 2009. It is the sequel to Khan Kluay and follows the further adventures of the war elephant of King Naresuan the Great. It is set during the war between Ayutthaya and Bago. Its theme is the need to protect family and country. In 2011,it was re dubbed into Hindi as Jumbo 2: The return of the big elephant and released on 21 October around Diwali time in India but received negative comments. The dubbing studio was Sound and Vision studio, India.

Voice cast
Taweelap Srivuthivong as Nga Nil
Ann Thongprasom as Chaba-Kaew
Attaporn Teemakorn as Khan Kluay
Nonzee Nimibutr as Nanda Bayin
Varuth Waratham as Jid Rid

Voice Cast (Hindi Version) 
Karan Trivedi as Jayveer Singh aka Jumbo
Mohini Bhoj as Sonia Singh, Jumbo's wife
Rajesh Kawa as Dildar Yadav 
Amar Babaria as Prince Vikramaditya 
Vinod Kulkarni as Mahakaal Singh, Bakhtaavar Singh's son
Yash Parekh as Neil
Julie Tejwani as Rasgulla / Hariya
Pooja Punjabi as Pinki
Ashar Shaikh as Khabri
Tanya Sinha as Luv Singh / Kush Singh, Jumbo's twin son

English version
In 2016, Grindstone Entertainment Group produced an English dubbed version of the movie known as Elephant Kingdom, which was released on DVD via Lionsgate Home Entertainment. The first Khan Kluay film was dubbed into English by the Weinstein Company under the name The Blue Elephant. The English version of the second film lacks any ties to the first Khan Kluay film in the writing. Consequently, there are numerous changes in the English version compared to the original film and even the first Khan Kluay film. For example, all the voices in the original are replaced by new actors in the English version, with Cary Elwes replacing Jeremy Redleaf as Khan Kluay, Alexa PenaVega replacing Miranda Cosgrove as Chaba-Kaew, Garrett Clayton replacing Martin Short as Jai, while Patrick Warburton voiced Nanda Bayin. The names of the characters are also changed, Khan Kluay's name is changed to Rok, Chaba-Kaew's name is changed to Melody, and Jai's name is changed to Wingman. This version of the movie can also be found on YouTube.

References

External links
 

2009 films
2000s children's animated films
2009 animated films
Thai children's films
Films set in the 1500s
Thai animated films
Thai 3D films
Thai-language films
Sahamongkol Film International films